Trenton is the capital city of the U.S. state of New Jersey and the seat of Mercer County. It was the capital of the United States from November 1 to December 24, 1784. Princeton and Trenton are the two principal cities of the Princeton-Trenton metropolitan statistical area, which encompasses those cities and all of Mercer County for statistical purposes and constitutes part of the New York combined statistical area by the U.S. Census Bureau. However, Trenton directly borders the Philadelphia metropolitan area to its west, and the city was part of the Philadelphia metropolitan area combined statistical area from 1990 until 2000. 

As of the 2020 United States census, Trenton was the state's 10th-most-populous municipality, with a population of 90,871, an increase of 5,958 (+7.0%) from the 2010 census count of 84,913, which in turn reflected a decline of 490 (-0.6%) from the 85,403 counted in the 2000 census. The Census Bureau's Population Estimates Program calculated that the city's population was 90,457 in 2021, ranking the city the 378th-most-populous in the country.

Trenton dates back at least to June 3, 1719, when mention was made of a constable being appointed for Trenton while the area was still part of Hunterdon County. Boundaries were recorded for Trenton Township as of March 2, 1720. A courthouse and jail were constructed in Trenton around 1720, and the Freeholders of Hunterdon County met annually in Trenton. 

Abraham Hunt was appointed in 1764 as Trenton's first Postmaster. On November 25, 1790, the Trenton became New Jersey's capital, and by November 13, 1792 the City of Trenton was formed within Trenton Township. Trenton Township was incorporated as one of New Jersey's initial group of 104 townships by an act of the New Jersey Legislature on February 21, 1798. On February 22, 1834, portions of Trenton Township were taken to form Ewing Township. The remaining portion of Trenton Township was absorbed by the city on April 10, 1837. A series of annexations took place over a 50-year period with the city absorbing South Trenton (April 14, 1851), portions of Nottingham Township (April 14, 1856), Chambersburg Township and Millham Township (both on March 30, 1888), and Wilbur (February 28, 1898). Portions of Ewing Township and Hamilton Township were annexed to Trenton on March 23, 1900.

History

The earliest known inhabitants of the area that is today Trenton were the Lenape Native Americans. The first European settlement in what would become Trenton was established by Quakers in 1679, in the region then called the Falls of the Delaware, led by Mahlon Stacy from Handsworth, Sheffield, England. Quakers were being persecuted in England at this time and North America provided an opportunity to exercise their religious freedom.

By 1719, the town adopted the name "Trent-towne", after William Trent, one of its leading landholders who purchased much of the surrounding land from Stacy's family. This name was later shortened to "Trenton".

On January 19, 1764, Benjamin Franklin, Postmaster General of the colonies, appointed Abraham Hunt, a Lieutenant Colonel in the New Jersey Hunterdon County militia and prominent merchant in Trenton, as the city's first postmaster. Hunt was again appointed Trenton's postmaster on October 13, 1775, shortly after the American Revolutionary War broke out.

During the American Revolutionary War, Trenton was the site of the Battle of Trenton, George Washington's first military victory. On December 25–26, 1776, Washington and his army, crossed the icy Delaware River to Trenton, where they defeated Hessian troops garrisoned there. The second battle of Trenton, Battle of the Assunpink Creek, was fought here on January 2, 1777. After the war, the Congress of the Confederation met for two months at the French Arms Tavern from November 1, 1784, to December 24, 1784. While the city was preferred by New England and other northern states as a permanent capital for the new country, the southern states ultimately prevailed in their choice of a location south of the Mason–Dixon line. On April 21, 1789, the city hosted a reception for George Washington on his journey to New York City for his first inauguration.

Trenton became the state capital in 1790, but prior to that year the New Jersey Legislature often met in the city. The city was incorporated in 1792. In 1799, the federal government relocated its offices to Trenton for a period of several months, following an outbreak of yellow fever in the then-capital of Philadelphia.

During the War of 1812, the United States Army's primary hospital was at a site on Broad Street.

Throughout the 19th century, Trenton grew steadily, as European immigrants came to work in its pottery and wire rope mills. In 1837, with the population now too large for government by council, a new mayoral government was adopted, with by-laws that remain in operation to this day.

The Trenton Six were a group of black men arrested for the alleged murder of an elderly white shopkeeper in January 1948 with a soda bottle. They were arrested without warrants, denied lawyers and sentenced to death based on what were described as coerced confessions. With the involvement of the Communist Party and the NAACP, there were several appeals, resulting in a total of four trials. Eventually the accused men (with the exception of one who died in prison) were released. The incident was the subject of the book Jersey Justice: The Story of the Trenton Six, written by Cathy Knepper.

Riots of 1968
The Trenton Riots of 1968 were a major civil disturbance that took place during the week following the assassination of civil rights leader Martin Luther King Jr. in Memphis on April 4. Race riots broke out nationwide following the murder of the civil rights activist. More than 200 Trenton businesses, mostly in Downtown, were ransacked and burned. More than 300 people, most of them young black men, were arrested on charges ranging from assault and arson to looting and violating the mayor's emergency curfew. In addition to 16 injured policemen, 15 firefighters were treated at city hospitals for injuries suffered while fighting raging blazes or inflicted by rioters. Area residents pulled false alarms and would then throw bricks at firefighters responding to the alarm boxes. This experience, along with similar experiences in other major cities, effectively ended the use of open-cab fire engines. As an interim measure, the Trenton Fire Department fabricated temporary cab enclosures from steel deck plating until new equipment could be obtained. The losses incurred by downtown businesses were initially estimated by the city to be $7 million, but the total of insurance claims and settlements came to $2.5 million.

Trenton's Battle Monument neighborhood was hardest hit. Since the 1950s, North Trenton had witnessed a steady exodus of middle-class residents, and the riots spelled the end for North Trenton. By the 1970s, the region had become one of the most blighted and crime-ridden in the city.

Geography

According to the U.S. Census Bureau, the city had a total area of 8.21 square miles (21.25 km2), including 7.58 square miles (19.63 km2) of land and 0.63 square miles (1.62 km2) of water (7.62%).

Several bridges across the Delaware River connect Trenton to Morrisville, Pennsylvania, all of which are operated by the Delaware River Joint Toll Bridge Commission. The Trenton–Morrisville Toll Bridge, originally constructed in 1952, stretches , carrying U.S. Route 1. The Lower Trenton Bridge, bearing the legend "Trenton Makes The World Takes Bridge", is a  span that was constructed in 1928 on the site of a bridge that dates back to 1804.

The city is sometimes included as part of North Jersey and as the southernmost city of the Tri-State Region, while others consider it a part of South Jersey and thus, the northernmost city of the Delaware Valley.

However, Mercer County constitutes its own metropolitan statistical area, the Trenton-Princeton MSA. Locals consider Trenton to be a part of an ambiguous area known as Central Jersey, and thus part of neither region. They are generally split as to whether they are within New York or Philadelphia's sphere of influence. While it is geographically closer to Philadelphia, many people who have recently moved to the area commute to New York City, and have moved there to escape the New York region's high housing costs.

Trenton is one of two state capitals that border another state—the other being Carson City, Nevada. It is also one of the seven state capitals located within the Piedmont Plateau.

Trenton borders Ewing Township, Hamilton Township and Lawrence Township in Mercer County; and Falls Township, Lower Makefield Township and Morrisville in Bucks County, Pennsylvania, across the Delaware River in Pennsylvania.

The Northeast Corridor goes through Trenton. A straight line drawn between Center City, Philadelphia and Downtown Manhattan would pass within 2000 feet of the New Jersey State House.

Neighborhoods
Trenton is home to numerous neighborhoods and sub-neighborhoods. The main neighborhoods are taken from the four cardinal directions (North, South, East, and West). Trenton was once home to large Italian, Hungarian, and Jewish communities, but, since the 1950s, demographic shifts have changed the city into a relatively segregated urban enclave of middle and lower income African Americans and newer immigrants, many of whom arrive from Latin America. Italians are scattered throughout the city, but a distinct Italian community is centered in the Chambersburg neighborhood, in South Trenton. This community has been in decline since the 1970s, largely due to economic and social shifts to the suburbs surrounding the city. Today Chambersburg has a large Latino community. Many of the Latino immigrants are from Mexico, Guatemala and Nicaragua. There is also a significant and growing Asian community in the Chambersburg neighborhood primarily made up of Burmese and Bhutanese/Nepali refugees.

The North Ward, once a mecca for the city's middle class, is now one of the most economically distressed, torn apart by race riots following the assassination of Martin Luther King Jr. in 1968. Nonetheless, the area still retains many important architectural and historic sites. North Trenton still has a large Polish-American neighborhood that borders Lawrence Township, many of whom attend St. Hedwig's Roman Catholic Church on Brunswick Avenue. St. Hedwig's church was built in 1904 by Polish immigrants, many of whose families still attend the church. North Trenton is also home to the historic Shiloh Baptist Church—one of the largest houses of worship in Trenton and the oldest African American church in the city, founded in 1888. The church is currently pastored by Rev. Darrell L. Armstrong, who carried the Olympic torch in 2002 for the Winter Olympics in Salt Lake City. Also located just at the southern tip of North Trenton is the city's Battle Monument, also known as "Five Points". It is a  structure that marks the spot where George Washington's Continental Army launched the Battle of Trenton during the American Revolutionary War. It faces downtown Trenton and is a symbol of the city's historic past.

South Ward is a diverse neighborhood, home to many Latin American, Italian-American, and African American residents.

East Ward is the smallest neighborhood in Trenton and is home to the Trenton Transit Center and Trenton Central High School. The Chambersburg neighborhood is within the East Ward and was once noted in the region as a destination for its many Italian restaurants and pizzerias. With changing demographics, many of these businesses have either closed or relocated to suburban locations. West Ward is the home of Trenton's more suburban neighborhoods.

Neighborhoods in the city include:

Downtown Trenton
Hanover/Academy
Mill Hill
East Trenton
Coalport/North Clinton
Ewing/Carroll
Greenwood/Hamilton
Villa Park
Wilbur
Western Trenton (not the same as West Trenton, which is outside the city limits in Ewing)
Berkeley Square
Cadwalader Heights
Central West
Fisher/Richey/Perdicaris
Glen Afton
Hillcrest
Hiltonia
Parkside
Pennington/Prospect
Stuyvesant/Prospect
The Island
West End
South Trenton
Chambersburg
Chestnut Park
Duck Island
Franklin Park
Lamberton/Waterfront
North Trenton
Battle Monument (Five Points)
North 25
Top Road

Climate
According to the Köppen climate classification, Trenton lies in the transition from a cooler humid continental climate (Dfa) and the warmer humid subtropical (Cfa), and  precipitation fairly evenly distributed through the year. The Cfa climate is the result of adiabatic warming of the Appalachians, low altitude and proximity to the coast without being on the immediate edge for moderate temperatures.

Episodes of extreme heat and humidity can occur with heat index values reaching .

Episodes of extreme cold and wind can occur with wind chill values below , every few years.

The wettest year on record was 1996, when  of precipitation fell. On the flip side, the driest month on record was October 1963, when only  of rain was recorded. The  of precipitation recorded in 1957 were the lowest ever for the city.

Snowfall can vary even more year to year. The average snowiest month is February which corresponds with the annual peak in nor'easter activity.

Demographics

2020 census

Note: the US Census treats Hispanic/Latino as an ethnic category. This table excludes Latinos from the racial categories and assigns them to a separate category. Hispanics/Latinos can be of any race.

2010 census

The Census Bureau's 2006–2010 American Community Survey showed that (in 2010 inflation-adjusted dollars) median household income was $36,601 (with a margin of error of +/− $1,485) and the median family income was $41,491 (+/− $2,778). Males had a median income of $29,884 (+/− $1,715) versus $31,319 (+/− $2,398) for females. The per capita income for the city was $17,400 (+/− $571). About 22.4% of families and 24.5% of the population were below the poverty line, including 36.3% of those under age 18 and 17.5% of those age 65 or over.

Economy

Trenton was a major manufacturing center in the late 19th and early 20th centuries. One relic of that era is the slogan "Trenton Makes, The World Takes", which is displayed on the Lower Free Bridge (just north of the Trenton–Morrisville Toll Bridge). The city adopted the slogan in 1917 to represent Trenton's then-leading role as a major manufacturing center for rubber, wire rope, ceramics and cigars. It was home to American Standards largest fixture factory.

Along with many other United States cities in the 1970s, Trenton fell on hard times when manufacturing and industrial jobs declined. Concurrently, state government agencies began leasing office space in the surrounding suburbs. State government leaders (particularly governors William Cahill and Brendan Byrne) attempted to revitalize the downtown area by making it the center of state government. Between 1982 and 1992, more than a dozen office buildings were constructed primarily by the state to house state offices. Today, Trenton's biggest employer is still the state of New Jersey. Each weekday, 20,000 state workers flood into the city from the surrounding suburbs.

Notable businesses of the thousands based in Trenton include Italian Peoples Bakery, a wholesale and retail bakery established in 1936. De Lorenzo's Tomato Pies and Papa's Tomato Pies were also fixtures of the city for many years, though both recently relocated to the suburbs.

Urban Enterprise Zone
Portions of Trenton are part of an Urban Enterprise Zone. The city was selected in 1983 as one of the initial group of 10 zones chosen to participate in the program. In addition to other benefits to encourage employment within the Zone, shoppers can take advantage of a reduced 3.3125% sales tax rate (half of the % rate charged statewide) at eligible merchants. Established in January 1986, the city's Urban Enterprise Zone status expires in December 2023.

The UEZ program in Trenton and four other original UEZ cities had been allowed to lapse as of January 1, 2017, after Governor Chris Christie, who called the program an "abject failure", vetoed a compromise bill that would have extended the status for two years. In May 2018, Governor Phil Murphy signed a law that reinstated the program in these five cities and extended the expiration date in other zones.

In 2018, the city had an average property tax bill of $3,274, the lowest in the county, compared to an average bill of $8,292 in Mercer County and $8,767 statewide. The city had the sixth-highest property tax rate in New Jersey, with an equalized rate of 5.264% in 2020, compared to 2.760% in the county as a whole and a statewide average of 2.279%.

Television market
Trenton has long been part of the Philadelphia television market. After the 2000 United States census, Trenton was shifted from the Philadelphia metropolitan statistical area to the New York metropolitan statistical area. With a similar shift by the New Haven, Connecticut, area to the New York area, they were the first two cases where metropolitan statistical areas differed from their defined Nielsen television markets. 

Trenton was the site of the studios of the former public television station New Jersey Network.

Landmarks

 New Jersey State Museum – Combines a collection of archaeology and ethnography, fine art, cultural history and natural history.
 New Jersey State House was originally constructed by Jonathan Doane in 1792, with major additions made in 1845, 1865 and 1871.
 New Jersey State Library serves as a central resource for libraries across the state as well as serving the state legislature and government.
 Trenton City Museum – Housed in the Italianate-style 1848 Ellarslie Mansion since 1978, the museum features artworks and other materials related to the city's history.
 Trenton War Memorial – Completed in 1932 as a memorial to the war dead from Mercer County during World War I and owned and operated by the State of New Jersey, the building is home to a theater with 1,800 seats that reopened in 1999 after an extensive, five-year-long renovation project.
 Old Barracks – Dating back to 1758 and the French and Indian War, the Barracks were constructed as a place to house British troops in lieu of housing the soldiers in the homes of area residents. The site was used by both the Continental Army and British forces during the Revolutionary War and stands as the last remaining colonial barracks in the state.
 Trenton Battle Monument – Located in the heart of the Five Points neighborhood, the monument was built to commemorate the Continental Army's victory in the December 26, 1776, Battle of Trenton. The monument was designed by John H. Duncan and features a statue of George Washington atop a pedestal that stands on a granite column  in height.
 Trenton City Hall – The building was constructed based on a 1907 design by architect Spencer Roberts and opened to the public in 1910. The council chambers stand two stories high and features a mural by Everett Shinn that highlights Trenton's industrial history.
 William Trent House – Constructed in 1719 by William Trent, who the following year laid out what would become the city of Trenton, the house was owned by Governor Lewis Morris, who used the house as his official residence in the 1740s. Governor Philemon Dickerson used the home as his official residence in the 1830s, as did Rodman M. Price in the 1850s.
 Adams and Sickles Building (added January 31, 1980 as #80002498) is a focal point for West End neighborhood, and is remembered for its soda fountain and corner druggist.
 Friends Burying Ground, adjacent to the Trenton Friends Meeting House, is the burial site of several national and state political figures prominent in the city's early history.
 Trenton Friends Meeting House (added April 30, 2008 as #08000362), dating back to 1739, it was occupied by the British Dragoons in 1776 and by the Continental Army later in the Revolutionary War.
 Carver Center – formerly the Sunlight Elks Lodge, it was named after George Washington Carver, African-American agricultural scientist and inventor. The building was added to the National Register of Historic Places for its significance in ethnic heritage - Black, from 1922 to 1975.

Sports

Because of Trenton's near-equal distance to both New York City and Philadelphia, and because most homes in Mercer County receive network broadcasts from both cities, locals are sharply divided in fan loyalty between both cities. It is common to find Philadelphia's Phillies, Eagles, 76ers, Union and Flyers fans cheering (and arguing) right alongside fans of New York's Yankees, Mets, Nets, Knicks, Rangers, Islanders, Jets, Red Bulls and Giants or the New Jersey Devils.

Between 1948 and 1979, Trenton Speedway, located in adjacent Hamilton Township, hosted world class auto racing. Drivers such as Jim Clark, A. J. Foyt, Mario Andretti, Al Unser, Bobby Unser, Richard Petty and Bobby Allison raced on the one-mile (1.6 km) asphalt oval and then re-configured -mile race track. The speedway, which closed in 1980, was part of the larger New Jersey State Fairgrounds complex, which also closed in 1983. The former site of the speedway and fairgrounds is now the Grounds for Sculpture.

The Trenton Thunder, minor league team owned by Joe Plumeri, plays at 6,341-seat Arm & Hammer Park, the stadium which Plumeri had previously named after his father in 1999. The team was previously affiliated with the New York Yankees, Boston Red Sox, Detroit Tigers, and, before moving to Trenton, the Chicago White Sox, but became an unaffiliated collegiate summer baseball team of the MLB Draft League beginning in 2021.

The Trenton Freedom of the Professional Indoor Football League were founded in 2013 and played their games at the Sun National Bank Center. The Freedom ended operations in 2015, joining the short-lived Trenton Steel (in 2011) and Trenton Lightning (in 2001) as indoor football teams that had brief operating lives at the arena.

Parks and recreation
 Cadwalader Park – Trenton's largest city park covering , it was designed by landscape architect Frederick Law Olmsted, who is most famous for designing New York City's Central Park.

Government

Local government

Trenton is governed within the Faulkner Act, formally known as the Optional Municipal Charter Law, under the Mayor-Council system of municipal government, one of 79 municipalities (of the 564) statewide that use this form of government. The governing body is comprised of a mayor and a seven-member city council. Three city council members are elected at-large, and four come from each of four wards. The mayor and council members are elected concurrently on a non-partisan basis to four-year terms of office as part of the November general election.

In October 2020, the city council overrode a mayoral veto and shifted municipal elections from May to November, with proponents citing the increased turnout and savings to the city of $180,000 in each election cycle. The mayor and members of council all had their term-end dates extended by six months and moved to December 31 from June 30, 2022. The city retained a runoff provision that would have a December runoff in the event that the candidate with the highest number of votes doesn't obtain a majority.

, the mayor of Trenton is Reed Gusciora, whose term of office ends December 31, 2026; before taking office as mayor, Gusciora had served in the New Jersey General Assembly. Members of the city council are Jasi Edwards (at-large), Crystal Feliciano (at-large), Teska Frisby (West Ward), Yazminelly Gonzalez (at-large), Joseph A. Harrison (East Ward), Jenna Figueroa Kettenburg (South Ward) and Jennifer Williams (North Ward). 

As they had not exceeded the minimum of 50 percent in the November 2022 general election, a run-off was held in December for the seats in the North and South Wards. Jennifer Williams won the North seat by a single vote against Algernon Ward, which made Williams the first transgender individual to be elected to a city council position in New Jersey history as well as being the first LGBTQ+ city council member in Trenton history. Jenna Figueroa Kettenburg won the South ward seat, defeating Damian G. Malave who had been ahead on Election Day but short of the cutoff, while a January 2023 runoff had Jasi Edwards, Crystal Feliciano and Yazminelly Gonzalez winning the three at-large seats.<ref name=Mercer2022RunoffAtLarge

In February 2023, Judge William Anklowitz of the New Jersey Superior Court heard a case for election challenges in the North Ward runoff election for both candidates Algernon Ward and Jennifer Williams. Three of the ballots Ward contested were all rejected because they were mail-in ballots that were returned without the required inner envelope. The other rejection Ward challenged was a case involving a cure letter that a voter sent to the wrong place, leading to it being not counted. Williams contested one ballot that was not counted due to it having both a vote for Ward and for Williams. Judge Anklowitz determined that the slash through Ward's vote signaled the voter's intention to vote for Williams and thus determined the vote should have been counted. These election challenges were heard following a recount that was held that did not change the outcome of the vote. Jennifer Williams thus remained to hold her seat on Trenton City Council for the North Ward seat.

In February 2022, the city council appointed Sonya Wilkins to fill the at-large seat expiring in December 2022 that had been held by Jerell A. Blakeley until he resigned from office the previous month to take a job outside the state.

Mayor's conviction and removal from office
On February 7, 2014, Tony F. Mack and his brother, Raphiel, were convicted by a federal jury of bribery, fraud and extortion, based on the details of their participation in a scheme to take money in exchange for helping get approvals to develop a downtown parking garage as part of a sting operation by law enforcement. Days after the conviction, the office of the New Jersey Attorney General filed motions to have Mack removed from office, as state law requires the removal of elected officials after convictions for corruption. Initially, Mack fought the removal of him from the office but on February 26, a superior court judge ordered his removal and any actions taken by Mack between February 7 and the 26th could have been reversed by Muschal. Previously, Mack's housing director quit after it was learned he had a theft conviction. His chief of staff was arrested trying to buy heroin. His half-brother, whose authority he elevated at the city water plant, was arrested on charges of stealing. His law director resigned after arguing with Mack over complying with open-records laws and potential violations of laws prohibiting city contracts to big campaign donors.

From February 7 to July 1, 2014, the acting mayor was George Muschal who retroactively assumed the office on that date due to Mack's felony conviction, who had taken office on July 1, 2010. Muschal, who was council president, was selected by the city council to serve as the interim mayor to finish the term.

Federal, state, and county representation

Trenton is located in the 12th Congressional District and is part of New Jersey's 15th state legislative district.

Politics
As of March 2011, there were a total of 37,407 registered voters in Trenton, of which 16,819 (45.0%) were registered as Democrats, 1,328 (3.6%) were registered as Republicans and 19,248 (51.5%) were registered as Unaffiliated. There were 12 voters registered to other parties.

{| align="center" border="2" cellpadding="4" cellspacing="0" style="float:right; margin: 1em 1em 1em 0; border: 1px #aaa solid; border-collapse: collapse; font-size: 95%;"
|+ Presidential Elections Results
|- bgcolor=lightgrey
! Year
!Republican
!Democratic
!Third Parties
|-
| style="text-align:center;" |2020
| style="text-align:center;" |11.2% 2,443
| style="text-align:center;" |88.2% 19,304
| style="text-align:center; background:honeyDew;" |0.6% 146
|-
| style="text-align:center;" |2016
| style="text-align:center;" |7.7% 1,715
| style="text-align:center;" |90.6% 20,131
| style="text-align:center; background:honeyDew;" |1.7% 379
|-
| style="text-align:center;" |2012
| style="text-align:center;" |6.2% 1,528
| style="text-align:center;" |93.4% 23,125
| style="text-align:center; background:honeyDew;" |0.4% 97
|-
| style="text-align:center;" |2008
| style="text-align:center;" |8.2% 2,157
| style="text-align:center;" |89.9% 23,577
| style="text-align:center; background:honeyDew;" |0.5% 141
|-
| style="text-align:center;" |2004| style="text-align:center;" |16.3% 3,791
| style="text-align:center;" |79.8%' 18,539| style="text-align:center; background:honeyDew;" |0.4% 146|}

In the 2012 presidential election, Democrat Barack Obama received 93.4% of the vote (23,125 cast), ahead of Republican Mitt Romney with 6.2% (1,528 votes), and other candidates with 0.4% (97 votes), among the 27,831 ballots cast by the city's 40,362 registered voters (3,081 ballots were spoiled), for a turnout of 69.0%. In the 2008 presidential election, Democrat Barack Obama received 89.9% of the vote here (23,577 cast), ahead of Republican John McCain with 8.2% (2,157 votes) and other candidates with 0.5% (141 votes), among the 26,229 ballots cast by the city's 41,005 registered voters, for a turnout of 64.0%.

In the 2013 gubernatorial election, Democrat Barbara Buono received 74.7% of the vote (9,179 cast), ahead of Republican Chris Christie with 24.7% (3,035 votes), and other candidates with 0.6% (77 votes), among the 11,884 ballots cast by the city's 38,452 registered voters (407 ballots were spoiled), for a turnout of 30.9%. In the 2009 gubernatorial election, Democrat Jon Corzine received 81.6% of the vote here (10,235 ballots cast), ahead of Republican Chris Christie with 12.4% (1,560 votes), Independent Chris Daggett with 2.4% (305 votes) and other candidates with 1.1% (135 votes), among the 12,537 ballots cast by the city's 38,345 registered voters, yielding a 32.7% turnout.

Fire department
The city of Trenton is protected on a full-time basis by the city of Trenton Fire and Emergency Services Department (TFD), which has been a paid department since 1892 after having been originally established in 1747 as a volunteer fire department. The TFD operates out of seven fire stations and operates a fire apparatus fleet of 7 engine companies, 3 ladder companies and one rescue company, along with one HAZMAT unit, an air cascade unit, a mobile command unit, a foam unit, one fireboat, and numerous special, support and reserve units, under the command of two battalion chiefs and a deputy chief/tour commander each shift.Fire & Emergency Services Apparatus, City of Trenton. Accessed March 15, 2020.

Education
Colleges and universities
Trenton is the home of two post-secondary institutions: Thomas Edison State University, serving adult students around the nation and worldwide and Mercer County Community College's James Kerney Campus.

The College of New Jersey, formerly named Trenton State College, was founded in Trenton in 1855 and is now located in nearby Ewing Township. Rider University was founded in Trenton in 1865 as The Trenton Business College. In 1959, Rider moved to its current location in nearby Lawrence Township.

Public schools
The Trenton Public Schools serve students in pre-kindergarten through twelfth grade. The district is one of 31 former Abbott districts statewide that were established pursuant to the decision by the New Jersey Supreme Court in Abbott v. Burke which are now referred to as "SDA Districts" based on the requirement for the state to cover all costs for school building and renovation projects in these districts under the supervision of the New Jersey Schools Development Authority.SDA Districts, New Jersey Schools Development Authority. Accessed March 1, 2022. The district's board of education, comprised of seven members, sets policy and oversees the fiscal and educational operation of the district through its superintendent administration. As a Type I school district, the board's trustees are appointed by the mayor to serve three-year terms of office on a staggered basis, with either two or three seats up for re-appointment each year. The board appoints a superintendent to oversee the district's day-to-day operations and a business administrator to supervise the business functions of the district.Board of Education , Trenton Public Schools. Accessed March 15, 2020. The school district has undergone a 'construction' renaissance throughout the district.

As of the 2018–19 school year, the district, comprised of 20 schools, had an enrollment of 14,500 students and 884.4 classroom teachers (on an FTE basis), for a student–teacher ratio of 16.4:1. Schools in the district (with 2018–19 enrollment data from the National Center for Education Statistics) are 
Columbus Elementary School (371 students; in grades K–5), 
Franklin Elementary School (405; K–5), 
Grant Elementary School (571; Pre-K–5), 
Gregory Elementary School (567; K–5), 
Harrison Elementary School (221; Pre-K–5), 
P.J. Hill Elementary School (800; Pre-K–5), 
Jefferson Elementary School (434; K–5), 
Dr. Martin Luther King, Jr. Elementary School (775; K–5), 
Mott Elementary School (426; K–5), 
Parker Elementary School (531; K–5), 
Robbins Elementary School (541; K–5), 
Washington Elementary School (409; K–5), 
Wilson Elementary School (498; Pre-K–5), 
Grace A. Dunn Middle School (893; 6–8), 
Hedgepeth-Williams Middle School (674; 6–8), 
Joyce Kilmer Middle School (370; 6–8), 
Luis Munoz Rivera Middle School (483; 6–8), 
Trenton Ninth Grade Academy (707; 9), 
Daylight/Twilight Alternative High School (443; 9–12) and 
Trenton Central High School (1,818; 9–12).2017-2018 Charter and Public School Directory, Mercer County, New Jersey. Accessed May 10, 2020.

Eighth-grade students from all of Mercer County are eligible to apply to attend the high school programs offered by the Mercer County Technical Schools, a county-wide vocational school district that offers full-time career and technical education at its Health Sciences Academy, STEM Academy and Academy of Culinary Arts, with no tuition charged to students for attendance.High School Programs, Mercer County Technical Schools. Accessed November 18, 2019.

Marie H. Katzenbach School for the Deaf (previously New Jersey School for the Deaf and New Jersey State Institution for the Deaf and Dumb), the statewide school for the deaf, opened in Trenton in 1883 and was there until 1923, when it moved to West Trenton.

Charter schools
Trenton is home to several charter schools, including Capital Preparatory Charter High School, Emily Fisher Charter School, Foundation Academy Charter School, International Charter School, Paul Robeson Charter School and Village Charter School.

The International Academy of Trenton, owned and monitored by the SABIS school network, became a charter school in 2014. On February 22, 2017, Trenton's mayor, Eric Jackson, visited the school when it opened its doors in the former Trenton Times building on 500 Perry Street, after completion of a $17 million renovation project. After receiving notice from the New Jersey Department of Education that the school's charter would not be renewed due to issues with academic performance and school management, the school closed its doors on June 30, 2018.

Private schools
Trenton Catholic Academy high school serves students in grades 9–12, while Trenton Catholic Academy grammar school serves students in Pre-K through 8th grade; both schools operate under the auspices of the Roman Catholic Diocese of Trenton.

Trenton is home to Al-Bayaan Academy, which opened for preschool students in September 2001 and added grades in subsequent years.

Trenton Community Music School is a not-for-profit community school of the arts. The school was founded by executive director Marcia Wood in 1997. The school operates at Blessed Sacrament Catholic Church (on Tuesdays) and the Copeland Center for the Performing Arts (on Saturdays).

Crime
The Trenton Police Department was founded in 1792, when the city was incorporated. It works in conjunction with the Mercer County Sheriff's Office.

In 2005, there were 31 homicides in Trenton, which at that time was the largest number in a single year in the city's history. The city was named the 4th "Most Dangerous" in 2005 out of 129 cities with a population of 75,000 to 99,999 ranked nationwide in the 12th annual Morgan Quitno survey. In the 2006 survey, Trenton was ranked as the 14th most dangerous city overall out of 371 cities included nationwide in the Morgan Quitno survey, and was again named as the fourth most dangerous municipality of 126 cities in the 75,000–99,999 population range. 

In September 2011, the city laid off 108 police officers due to budget cuts; this constituted almost one-third of the Trenton Police Department and required 30 senior officers to be sent out on patrols in lieu of supervisory duties.

In 2013, the city set a new record with 37 homicides. In 2014, there were 23 murders through the end of July and the city's homicide rate was on track to break the record set the previous year until an 81-day period when there were no murders in Trenton; the city ended the year with 34 murders.McEvoy, James. "Authorities ID Trenton homicide victim, investigate separate shooting", The Times, October 19, 2014. Accessed May 16, 2016. "Sutphin's slaying was the first homicide in Trenton since July 30 when Tyshawn Goodman, 25, of Trenton, and George Jamison, 44, of Pennington, were shot to death in what police believed were separate robberies. The nearly three months of relative peace followed a bloody start in which the city saw 23 homicides in the first seven months of the year." In 2020, the city surpassed the 2013 homicide number with a record 40 homicides.

New Jersey State Prison
The New Jersey State Prison (formerly Trenton State Prison) has two maximum security units. It houses some of the state's most dangerous individuals, which included New Jersey's death row population until the state banned capital punishment in 2007.

The following is inscribed over the original entrance to the prison:

Labor, Silence, Penitence.
The Penitentiary House,
Erected By Legislative
Authority.
Richard Howell, Governor.
In The XXII Year Of
American Independence
MDCCXCVII
That Those Who Are Feared
For Their Crimes
May Learn To Fear The Laws
And Be Useful
Hic Labor, Hic Opus.

Transportation
Roads and highways

Several highways pass through the city. Theseinclude the Trenton Freeway (part of U.S. Route 1) and the John Fitch Parkway, which is part of Route 29. Canal Boulevard, more commonly known as Route 129, connects U.S. Route 1 and Route 29 in South Trenton. U.S. Route 206, Route 31 and Route 33 also pass through the city via regular city streets (Broad Street/Brunswick Avenue/Princeton Avenue, Pennington Avenue, and Greenwood Avenue, respectively).

Route 29 connects the city to Interstate 295 and Interstate 195, the latter providing a connection to the New Jersey Turnpike (Interstate 95) at Exit 7A in Robbinsville Township.

Public transportation

Public transportation within the city and to/from its nearby suburbs is provided in the form of local bus routes run by NJ Transit. SEPTA also provides bus service to adjacent Bucks County, Pennsylvania.

The Trenton Transit Center, located on the heavily traveled Northeast Corridor, serves as the northbound terminus for SEPTA's Trenton Line (local train service to Philadelphia) and southbound terminus for NJ Transit Rail's Northeast Corridor Line (local train service to New York Penn Station). The train station also serves as the northbound terminus for the River Line, a diesel light rail line that runs to Camden. Two additional River Line stops, Cass Street and Hamilton Avenue, are located within the city.

Long-distance transportation is provided by Amtrak train service along the Northeast Corridor.

NJ Transit Bus Operations provides bus service between Trenton and Philadelphia on the 409 route, with service to surrounding communities on the 600, 601, 602, 603, 604, 606, 607, 608, 609 and 611 routes.Mercer County Rider Guide , NJ Transit. Accessed November 27, 2019.

The Greater Mercer Transportation Management Association offers service on the Route 130 Connection between the Trenton Transit Center and the South Brunswick warehouse district with stops along the route including Hamilton train station, Hamilton Marketplace, Hightstown and East Windsor Town Center Plaza.

Media
Trenton is served by two daily newspapers, The Times and The Trentonian, and a monthly advertising magazine, "The City" Trenton N.E.W.S.. Radio station WKXW and Top 40 WPST are also licensed to Trenton. Defunct periodicals include the Trenton True American''. A local television station, WPHY-CD TV-25, serves the Trenton area.

Trenton is officially part of the Philadelphia television market but some local pay TV operators also carry stations serving the New York City market. While it is its own radio market, many Philadelphia and New York stations are easily receivable.

Notable people

See also
 Relocation of the United States Government to Trenton
 USS Trenton, 4 ships

References

Sources

External links

 City of Trenton website
 Trenton Historical Society
 
 US Census Data for Trenton, NJ

 
1719 establishments in New Jersey
Cities in Mercer County, New Jersey
County seats in New Jersey
Faulkner Act (mayor–council)
Former capitals of the United States
New Jersey populated places on the Delaware River
New Jersey Urban Enterprise Zones
Populated places established in 1719
Supreme Court of New Jersey